Mestolaemus fallax is a species of beetle in the family Laemophloeidae, the only species in the genus Mestolaemus.

References

Laemophloeidae